The 2011 NASCAR Camping World Truck Series was the seventeenth season of the third highest stock car racing in the United States. The season included twenty-five races, beginning with the NextEra Energy Resources 250 at Daytona International Speedway and ending with the Ford 200 at Homestead-Miami Speedway. During the 2010 season, NASCAR announced a few notable calendar changes, including a race addition at Kentucky Speedway and the removal of Gateway International Raceway from the schedule. DeLana Harvick won the owners' championship, while Austin Dillon of Richard Childress Racing won the drivers' championship with a tenth-place finish at the final race of the season. Chevrolet won the manufacturers' championship with 193 points.

Teams and drivers

Complete schedule

Part-time schedule

Note: A driver designated with a (R) next to their name indicates that they are contenders for the 2011 Rookie of the Year award.

Team changes
Germain Racing added the No. 9 team to its full-time lineup with Max Papis.
Billy Ballew Motorsports and Vision Aviation Racing merged to continue to field No. 15 and No. 51 trucks but after six races, Vision Aviation Racing was shut down.

Began operations
Texas businessmen Bob Leavine and Lance Fenton have formed Leavine Fenton Racing. Fenton ran a partial schedule in the No. 95 Ford.
Virginia native Joe Denette started his own race team, Joe Denette Motorsports. Denette is a NASCAR fan who won the Virginia Lottery Mega Million in May 2009 after being laid off four months prior. He has teamed with fellow Virginian Hermie Sadler to start his own team with assistance from Kevin Harvick, Inc. Jason White joined the team for the 2011 season.

Discontinued operations
Team Gill Racing shut down with their assets having been purchased by Eddie Sharp Racing.

Driver changes
Mike Skinner parted ways with Randy Moss Motorsports after the 2010 season due to a lack of chemistry. In an interview with Sirius Speedway, Skinner said that he had talked to a few teams and would prefer to remain with Toyota. On February 11, Skinner announced that he would drive the No. 45 of Eddie Sharp Racing at Daytona and potentially at Phoenix.

Changed teams
Justin Lofton was released by Red Horse Racing after his rookie season. He drove the No. 77 for Germain Racing.
Jason White leaves SS-Green Light Racing and joined the new Joe Denette Motorsports team.
Midway through 2011, Germain Racing was unable to field its flagship No. 30 Toyota driven by Todd Bodine due to a lack of sponsorship. Germain announced on July 13 that they would partner with Randy Moss Motorsports to put Bodine in the No. 5 for the rest of 2011, releasing Travis Kvapil. According to owner Bob Germain, the trucks was prepared by Germain but given the #5.

Entered the series
Joey Coulter drove full-time this season with Richard Childress Racing, as a teammate to Austin Dillon. He drove the No. 22 Silverado and had veteran Harold Holly as crew chief.
Fourth-generation driver Jeffrey Earnhardt ran for ROTY with Rick Ware Racing. However, he was released after 3 races when Fuel Doctor decided to leave.
Johanna Long moved up to full-time status for 2011 with her Panhandle Motorsports team.
Former Renault F1 driver Nelson Piquet Jr. drove for Kevin Harvick, Inc. full-time this season.
With Eddie Sharp Racing having purchased Team Gill Racing, 2010 ARCA runner-up Craig Goess drove the No. 46 Toyota full-time in 2011.
Brazilian driver Miguel Paludo drove Red Horse Racing's No. 7 Toyota full-time.
Vision Aviation Racing teammates Dusty Davis and Justin Johnson moved up from the NASCAR K&N Pro Series West to drive the No. 15 and No. 51 Toyotas respectively. They were not approved to run at Daytona International Speedway, so Michael Waltrip and Aric Almirola drove the No. 15 and #51.
Chris Eggleston attempted to run for ROTY with Winfield Motorsports.
Red Bull development driver Cole Whitt, after spending a season in the K&N Pro Series East, ran for ROTY with Stacy Compton's Turn One Racing.
Chase Mattioli, son of Pocono Raceway owner Joseph Mattioli, formed his own team, Chase Mattioli Racing and ran the full 2011 season. Mattioli was unable to start at Daytona due to a gastrointestinal infection and had Chad McCumbee drive. The team used Jennifer Jo Cobb Racing's owner points from 2010, as Jennifer Jo Cobb is running the Nationwide Series.
 Formula One World Champion Kimi Räikkönen announced that he would run a part-time schedule starting in the summer, driving for his own ICE 1 Racing team in a partnership with Foster Gillett. On April 2, it was announced that Räikkönen would instead drive a limited schedule for Kyle Busch Motorsports starting at Charlotte. He entered at Charlotte driving Vision Aviation Racing's No. 15 Toyota, fielded by Busch.

Returned to the series
Brendan Gaughan returns to the Truck Series full-time for the first time since 2008. He drove for Germain Racing.
Travis Kvapil returns to the Truck Series full-time for the first time since 2007. He drove the No. 5 for Randy Moss Motorsports, replacing Mike Skinner. Kvapil also ran the Sprint Cup title while driving the No. 38 Ford for Front Row Motorsports.
Justin Marks returns to NASCAR for the first time since 2008. He drove for Stacy Compton's Turn One Racing.

Exited the series
Aric Almirola drove for JR Motorsports in the Nationwide Series due to lack of sponsorship being found for Vision Aviation Racing; he returned to the No. 51 truck for the NextEra Energy Resources 250 at Daytona as Vision Aviation Racing's drivers were both ineligible to run Daytona because of NASCAR's requirements for driver experience before running Daytona or Talladega.
Narain Karthikeyan returned to Formula One this season with Hispania Racing.

Mid-season changes
Justin Lofton parted ways with Germain Racing after the WinStar World Casino & Resort 400. He soon signed with Eddie Sharp Racing, which, ironically, was the team that Lofton won the 2009 ARCA Remax Series championship with. Craig Goess, the driver Lofton replaced, is currently unable to find a ride.
Due to season struggles, Randy Moss Motorsports and Germain Racing joined forces to field Todd Bodine in the No. 5 truck for the remainder of the season after the UNOH 225. The team ran out of the Germain shop and crew chiefed by Mike Hillman Jr. The move leaves Travis Kvapil without a ride, and original crew chief Dan Stillman moved to ThorSport Racing.

Rookie entries
The 2011 Camping World Truck Series rookie class, from the outset, was packed with talent. Ranging from development drivers Cole Whitt, Joey Coulter, and Parker Kligerman to Snowball Derby winner Johanna Long, ex-Formula 1 driver Nelson Piquet Jr., fourth-generation driver Jeffrey Earnhardt, ARCA Racing Series runner-up Craig Goess, and Brazilian touring car driver Miguel Paludo. From the outset, Whitt impressed many by winning the pole at Darlington early on, but struggled midway through the season. Earnhardt's Rick Ware Racing truck team shut down after Martinsville when sponsor Fuel Doctor abruptly left the team for Turn One Racing. Goess was released by Eddie Sharp Racing after only 9 races and was replaced by Justin Lofton.  Sponsorship woes sidelined Long's rookie bid, as well as those of Dusty Davis and Justin Johnson. Paludo managed 7 top 10s in his first full season. Kligerman, Coulter, and Piquet improved their finishes mid-season, surging past a struggling Whitt. Eventually, Coulter emerged on top as ROTY.

2011 calendar
Speed televised the entire season.

Calendar changes

The Lucas Oil 150, held at Phoenix International Raceway, was moved from November to February, causing it to become the second race of the season.
Darlington Raceway's race date moved from August to March.
Kentucky Speedway received an additional race in July.
Atlanta Motor Speedway's race date moved from March to September.
Kansas Speedway's race date moved to June.
Gateway International Raceway was not included in the calendar.

Results and standings

Races

Drivers' standings

(key) Bold - Pole position awarded by time. Italics - Pole position earned by final practice results or rainout. * – Most laps led.

1 – Post entry, driver and owner did not score points.
2 – Driver originally registered for Truck points; Bell switched to Sprint Cup after Charlotte, Crum switched to Nationwide after Kentucky, Duke switched to Nationwide after Martinsville.
3 – Ickler was not registered for Truck points at Texas.
4 - Hornaday Jr. received a 25-point penalty for an infraction of his truck's rear gear.
5 - Sauter suffered a 6-point penalty after failing post-race inspection.

Manufacturer

See also 

2011 NASCAR Sprint Cup Series
2011 NASCAR Nationwide Series
2011 NASCAR Canadian Tire Series
2011 NASCAR Corona Series
2011 NASCAR Stock V6 Series

References

 
NASCAR Truck Series seasons